Fredonia Township is a civil township of Calhoun County in the U.S. state of Michigan located southwest of the city of Marshall. It is part of the Battle Creek Metropolitan Statistical Area. The population was 1,626 at the 2010 census.

Geography

Transportation
Fredonia Township is accessed by the following major roadways:
Interstate 69 (exit 32)
M227

There is no railroad service within the township.

Communities
Ellis Corner is a named place located at the intersection or H Drive South and 13 Mile Road. This was also the location of a post office in this township from 1882 until 1901. The Fredonia Township Fire Station #2 is located in Ellis Corners.
Marshall city limit extends into the northeast corner of the township.
Wrights Corner is a named place located at the intersection of F Drive South (M227) and 17 Mile Road (Old 27) and the location of the township hall and fire station #1.

Demographics

As of the census of 2010 there were 1,626 people, 679 households, and 503 families residing in the township.

Of the 679 households, 29.0% had children under the age of 18 living with them, 61.9% were married couples living together, 8.5% had a female householder with no husband present, and 25.9% were non-families. 22.1% of all households were made up of individuals, and 8.1% had someone living alone who was 65 years of age or older.  The average household size was 2.53 and the average family size was 2.91.

The township population age distribution was 23.3% under the age of 18, 7.6% from 18 to 24, 27.2% from 25 to 44, 27.9% from 45 to 64, and 13.9% who were 65 years of age or older.  The median age was 41 years. For every 100 females, there were 96.0 males.  For every 100 females age 18 and over, there were 97.2 males.

The median income for a household in the township was $46,635, and the median income for a family was $50,909. Males had a median income of $35,388 versus $28,875 for females. The per capita income for the township was $21,354.  About 5.6% of families and 7.8% of the population were below the poverty line, including 13.3% of those under age 18 and 6.0% of those age 65 or over.

References

Notes

Sources

External links 
 Fredonia Township official website

Townships in Calhoun County, Michigan
Townships in Michigan